This is a list of early transmissions of coronavirus disease 2019 (COVID-19) in the United States, covering cases that occurred in January and February 2020.

By the end of February, 24 cases were known, a number that had increased to 27,368 by the end of March, and continued to grow over the year. The outbreak evolved into a severe pandemic over the course of the year, with extremely rapid growth in cases after that point. In addition to those 24 cases known by the end of February, this list includes three cases which were confirmed later by phylogenetic analysis and post-mortems for a total of 27 cases. This list does not include repatriated cases- such as the fourteen infected citizens brought back from the Diamond Princess in February.

Limited testing at the time means that it is likely there were additional undetected cases. Dr. Sara Cody, medical officer for Santa Clara County (which saw a number of the first cases) stated that those confirmed at the time represented only "the tip of an iceberg".

List of cases

References 

COVID-19 pandemic in the United States
January 2020 events in the United States
February 2020 events in the United States